The Curtiss P-60 was a 1940s American single-engine single-seat, low-wing monoplane fighter aircraft developed by the Curtiss-Wright company as a successor to their P-40. It went through a lengthy series of prototype versions, eventually evolving into a design that bore little resemblance to the P-40. None of these versions reached production.

Design and development
The initial design contained in proposals to the United States Army Air Corps was for an aircraft based upon the P-40 design but featuring a low drag laminar flow wing, a Continental XIV-1430-3 inverted vee engine, and eight wing-mounted 0.5 in (12.7 mm) machine guns. This proposal was accepted and a contract for two prototypes was issued on 1 October 1940 with the aircraft designated the XP-53.

Within two months the Army Air Corps modified the contract to require the second prototype be completed with a Rolls-Royce Merlin engine in place of the XIV-1430. That aircraft was re-designated XP-60. The airframe design for the XP-60 was modified for the different engine, and the main landing gear was changed from the rearward-retracting P-40 design to a new inward retracting version, which allowed a wider wheelbase and a smooth wing surface when the gear was retracted. This aircraft first flew on 18 September 1941 with a British-built Merlin 28 engine. The XP-53 prototype was then converted into a static test airframe for the XP-60.

Considering delivery delays of quantities of the Packard-built Merlin engines due to its use in other fighters, the use of a turbo-supercharged Allison V-1710-75 engine was considered in its place. Consequently, on 31 October 1941, a contract for 1,900 P-60A fighters using the Allison engine, was awarded.

Flight tests of the XP-60 prototype did not progress smoothly. In addition to landing gear problems, expected top speed was not being met due to shortcomings in the laminar-flow wing surface finish, relatively high radiator drag (compared to the North American P-51 Mustang, which was then flying), and less than specified engine output performance. Consequently, work on the P-60A was stopped after 20 December 1941, when the USAAF recommended that Curtiss concentrate on license production of Republic P-47 Thunderbolts.

On 2 January 1942, a new order was issued, for one XP-60A with the Allison V-1710-75 engine and a General Electric B-14 turbo-supercharger, one XP-60B with the Allison V-1710-75 engine and a Wright SU-504-1 turbo-supercharger, and one XP-60C with the massive Chrysler XIV-2220 sixteen cylinder inverted vee engine.

At the time, availability of the Chrysler engine was coming into question, and after Curtiss noted that several hundreds of pounds of lead would be needed in the tail of the existing airframe for balance, a decision was made to install a Pratt & Whitney R-2800 radial engine in the XP-60C. In the meantime, Curtiss installed a Merlin 61 engine in the original XP-60, and after enlarging the vertical tail surface this aircraft was redesignated XP-60D.

The XP-60A first flew on 1 November 1942. While official interest in the type was waning (with the emergence of newer designs), the promise of improved performance from use of the R-2800 engine, resulted in a contract for 500 aircraft, officially designated P-60A-1-CU, with the R-2800 and contra-rotating propellers. With concern that the contra-rotating propellers would not be available on time, the XP-60B was modified to take the R-2800-10 engine driving a four-bladed propeller. As a result of the other prototype variants, this modification was redesignated XP-60E.

On 27 January 1943, the XP-60C flew for the first time, powered by an R-2800-53 engine with contra-rotating propellers. The aircraft's flying characteristics were found to be generally satisfactory. The first flight of the XP-60E with the four-bladed propeller was delayed until 26 May 1943 after it was found that due to its lighter weight, the engine installation had to be moved 10 inches forward compared to the XP-60C.

In April 1943, the US Army Air Forces decided to conduct an evaluation of the various fighter aircraft in development and use, in order to eliminate the least desirable models. Curtiss was requested to have the XP-60E participate. As the XP-60E was not available, the company hurriedly prepared the XP-60C for the evaluation at Patterson Field. In the event, due to various issues, the XP-60C performed poorly, resulting in reduction of the production run of 500 aircraft to two aircraft.

In January 1944, the XP-60E was flown to Eglin Field for official trials, where USAAF pilots found that it did not compare favorably to contemporary aircraft designs. However, when Curtiss suggested abandoning future work on the P-60 series, the USAAF insisted on completion of at least one of the two aircraft already in production.

The XP-60E survived to be sold as an entry for the 1947 National Air Races, but crashed during a qualifying flight before the competition was held.

Operational history

Somewhat confusingly, the first production aircraft was still designated YP-60A-1-CU, although this was later changed to YP-60E, to conform with the naming of previous prototypes. 

The YP-60E was powered by a 2,100 hp (1,566 kW) R-2800-18 engine. It also featured a cut-down rear fuselage and bubble canopy for improved visibility.
 
It first flew on 13 July 1944 and was subsequently delivered to Wright Field. However, as the government's development contract had already been cancelled (June 1943), there was no budget for further modifications, let alone a guarantee of a final purchase order. Consequently, the only production YP-60E completed was scrapped, on 22 December 1944. Curtiss built 354 Republic P-47Gs instead for the USAAF.

Variants 
XP-53
Curtiss Model 88; derivative of XP-46 to Request for Data R40-C specifications. Laminar flow wing and Continental XIV-1430-3 engine. Contracted for 1 October 1940; cancelled in favor of XP-60 in November 1941. Two built, one converted to the XP-60, the other used as a static test airframe.
XP-60
Curtiss Model 90; Rolls-Royce Merlin engine, armament 8 .50-cal machine guns. One built, first flight 18 September 1941; modified to XP-60D.
XP-60A
Curtiss Model 95A; Allison V-1710-75 engine with B-14 turbosupercharger; armament: six .50-cal MG. One built.
P-60A
Planned production version of XP-60; 1900 ordered, all cancelled.
YP-60A-1
Pre-production version of P-60A-1 with single prop. Twenty-six ordered; two built; one rebuilt as YP-60E.
P-60A-1
Planned production version of XP-60C with Pratt & Whitney R-2800-18 engine and contraprop; armament: four .50-cal MG. 500 ordered; cancelled before any built.
XP-60B
Curtiss Model 95B; V-1710-75 engine with SU-504-2 turbosupercharger; armament: six .50-cal MG. One built, modified to XP-60E.
XP-60C
Curtiss Model 95C; planned for Chrysler XIV-2220 engine, built with R-2800-53 and contraprop; armament: six .50-cal MG. One built. Rebuilt as XP-60E; original XP-60E rebuilt as XP-60C.
XP-60D
Rebuilt XP-60. Curtiss Model 90B; Packard V-1650-3 engine; crashed 6 May 1943.
XP-60E
Rebuilt XP-60B. Curtiss Model 95D; R-2800-10 engine; crashed January 1944. XP-60C reconfigured to XP-60E status.
YP-60E
Modified YP-60A-1 with bubble canopy. First flight 15 July 1944; cancelled 22 December 1944.
XP-60F
Planned modification of YP-60A-1 with different model of R-2800; cancelled before conversion.

Specifications (XP-60C)

See also

References

Notes

Bibliography

 Bowers, Peter M. Curtiss Aircraft, 1907–1947. London: Putnam & Company Ltd., 1979. .
 Dorr, Robert F. and Jon Lake. Fighters of the United States Air Force. London: Temple Press, 1990. .
 Green, William. War Planes of the Second World War, Volume Four: Fighters. London: MacDonald & Co. (Publishers) Ltd., 1961 (Sixth impression 1969). .
 Green, William and Gordon Swanborough. WW2 Aircraft Fact Files: US Army Air Force Fighters, Part 1. London: Macdonald and Jane's Publishers Ltd., 1977. .
 Jones, Lloyd S. U.S. Fighters: 1925-1980s. Fallbrook, California: Aero Publishers, Inc., 1975. .
 Norton, Bill. U.S. Experimental & Prototype Aircraft Projects: Fighters 1939–1945. North Branch, Minnesota: Specialty Press, 2008, pp. 80–85. .

External links

 Curtiss-Wright P-60
 Curtiss XP-60E

P-60
Curtiss P-60
Single-engined tractor aircraft
Low-wing aircraft
Cancelled military aircraft projects of the United States
Aircraft first flown in 1941